The 2014 Maryland Terrapins baseball team represented the University of Maryland, College Park during the 2014 NCAA Division I baseball season. The Terrapins played their home games at Shipley Field, in their final season as members of the Atlantic Coast Conference. Maryland finished the regular season with a 34–19 record, including a 15–14 record in ACC play, finishing in a tie for second place in the ACC Atlantic Division standings, behind Florida State and tied with Clemson. Maryland earned a bid to the 2014 NCAA Division I baseball tournament, where they were placed in the Charlottesville Super Regional, with South Carolina, Old Dominion, and Campbell in the Columbia Regional. Maryland defeated Old Dominion and South Carolina (twice) to advance to the Super Regional, where there lost two out of three games to eventual national runner-up Virginia.

Previous season
In 2013, the Terrapins finished the season fourth in the ACC Atlantic Division with a record of 30–25, and 11–19 in conference play. They failed to qualify for the 2013 Atlantic Coast Conference baseball tournament or the 2013 NCAA Division I baseball tournament.

Roster

Schedule

! style="background:#CE1126;color:white;"| Regular Season
|- valign="top" 

|- bgcolor="#ffbbbb"
| 1 || February 14 || @ #20 Florida ||  || Alfred A. McKethan Stadium || 0–4 || Poyner (1–0) || Stinnett (0–1) || Young (1) || 4,026 || 0–1 || 0–0
|- bgcolor="#bbffbb"
| 2 || February 15 || @ #20 Florida ||  || Alfred A. McKethan Stadium || 9–7 || Shawaryn (1–0) || Morales (0–1) || Mooney (1) || 3,900 || 1–1 || 0–0
|- bgcolor="#ffbbbb"
| 3 || February 16 || @ #20 Florida ||  || Alfred A. McKethan Stadium || 5–8 (8) || Hanhold (1–0) || Price (0–1) || Harris (1) || 3,742 || 1–2 || 0–0
|- bgcolor="#bbffbb"
| 4 || February 22 ||  ||  || Shipley Field || 3–0 || Stinnett (1–1) || Schlitter (0–1) || Brewster (1) || 576 || 2–2 || 0–0
|- bgcolor="#bbffbb"
| 5 || February 22 || Bryant ||  || Shipley Field || 3–0 || Shawaryn (2–0) || McAvoy (0–1) || Mooney (2) || 848 || 3–2 || 0–0
|- bgcolor="#bbffbb"
| 6 || February 23 || Bryant ||  || Shipley Field || 7–3 || Price (1–1) || Hayward (0–1) ||  || 398 || 4–2 || 0–0
|- bgcolor="#bbffbb"
| 7 || February 25 || @  ||  || Eagle Field || 13–6 || Drossner (1–0) || Howerton (1–1) ||  || 276 || 5–2 || 0–0
|-

|- bgcolor="#bbffbb"
| 8 || March 1 || UMass ||  || Shipley Field || 4–0 || Stinnett (2–1) || LeBlanc (0–2) ||  || 314 || 6–2 || 0–0
|- bgcolor="#bbffbb"
| 9 || March 1 || UMass ||  || Shipley Field || 10–1 || Shawaryn (3–0) || Moloney (0–2) ||  || 397 || 7–2 || 0–0
|- bgcolor="#bbffbb"
| 10 || March 2 || UMass ||  || Shipley Field || 3–2 (10) || Robinson (1–0) || Plunkett (0–1) ||  || 263 || 8–2 || 0–0
|- bgcolor="#ffbbbb"
| 11 || March 7 || @ #2 Florida State ||  || Dick Howser Stadium || 3–15 || Weaver (3–1) || Stinnett (2–2) ||  || 4,056 || 8–3 || 0–1
|- bgcolor="#bbffbb"
| 12 || March 8 || @ #2 Florida State ||  || Mike Martin Field at Dick Howser Stadium|Dick Howser Stadium || 5–1 || Shawaryn (4–0) || Leibrandt (2–1) ||  || 4,801 || 9–3 || 1–1
|- bgcolor="#ffbbbb"
| 13 || March 9 || @ #2 Florida State ||  || Mike Martin Field at Dick Howser Stadium|Dick Howser Stadium || 0–7 || Compton (2–0) || Price (1–2) ||  || 4,059 || 9–4 || 1–2
|- bgcolor="#bbffbb"
| 14 || March 11 ||  ||  || Shipley Field || 10–1 || Stiles (1–0) || Geffre (0–2) ||  || 408 || 10–4 || 1–2
|- bgcolor="#ffbbbb"
| 15 || March 14 || #13  ||  || Shipley Field || 0–7 || Thornton (5–0) || Stinnett (2–3) ||  || 523 || 10–5 || 1–3
|- bgcolor="#bbffbb"
| 16 || March 15 || #13 North Carolina ||  || Shipley Field || 3–2 || Stiles (2–0) || Rice (0–1) ||  || 610 || 11–5 || 2–3
|- bgcolor="#ffbbbb"
| 17 || March 16 || #13 North Carolina ||  || Shipley Field || 4–9 || Gallen (2–1) || Mooney (0–1) ||  || 523 || 11–6 || 2–4
|- bgcolor="#bbffbb"
| 18 || March 18 || Delaware ||  || Harford Baseball Field || 5–2 || Ruse (1–0) || Milley (0–1) || Stiles (1) || 120 || 12–6 || 2–4
|- bgcolor="#bbffbb"
| 19 || March 19 ||  ||  || Harford Baseball Field || 6–0 || Drossner (2–0) || Mikush (0–1) ||  || 146 || 13–6 || 2–4
|- bgcolor="#bbffbb"
| 20 || March 21 || #11  ||  || Shipley Field || 10–0 || Stinnett (3–3) || Rodon (2–4) ||  || 493 || 14–6 || 3–4
|- bgcolor="#bbffbb"
| 21 || March 22 || #11 NC State ||  || Shipley Field || 7–4 || Shawaryn (5–0) || Jernigan (3–2) || Mooney (3) || 438 || 15–6 || 4–4
|- bgcolor="#bbffbb"
| 22 || March 23 || #11 NC State ||  || Shipley Field || 5–2 || Ruse (2–0) || Stone (3–1) || Mooney (4) || 403 || 16–6 || 5–4
|- bgcolor="#ffbbbb"
| 23 || March 28 || #20 Clemson || #25 || Shipley Field || 1–3 || Gossett (3–0) || Casas (0–1) || Campbell (5) || 449 || 16–7 || 5–5
|- bgcolor="#ffbbbb"
| 24 || March 28 || #20 Clemson || #25 || Shipley Field || 1–7 || Crownover (5–2) || Shawaryn (5–1) ||  || 575 || 16–8 || 5–6
|-

|- bgcolor="#bbffbb"
| 25 || April 1 || VCU ||  || Shipley Field || 5–2 || Ruse (3–0) || Howie (2–1) || Mooney (5) || 508 || 17–8 || 5–6
|- bgcolor="#bbffbb"
| 26 || April 2 ||  ||  || Shipley Field || 8–3 || Drossner (3–0) || Lyons (2–1) ||  || 331 || 18–8 || 5–6
|- bgcolor="#ffbbbb"
| 27 || April 4 || @  ||  || Wake Forest Baseball Park || 4–6 || Fischer (4–2) || Stinnett (3–4) || Fossas (7) || 564 || 18–9 || 5–7
|- bgcolor="#ffbbbb"
| 28 || April 5 || @ Wake Forest ||  || Wake Forest Baseball Park || 2–5 || McLeod (5–1) || Shawaryn (5–2) || Fossas (8) || 843 || 18–10 || 5–8
|- bgcolor="#bbffbb"
| 29 || April 6 || @ Wake Forest ||  || Wake Forest Baseball Park || 11–3 || Ruse (4–0) || Kaden (2–3) ||  || 648 || 19–10 || 6–8
|- bgcolor="#bbffbb"
| 30 || April 8 || @  ||  || Spuhler Field || 11–0 || Drossner (4–0) || Bowie (0–3) ||  || 111 || 20–10 || 6–8
|- bgcolor="#ffbbbb"
| 31 || April 9 ||  ||  || Shipley Field || 2–3 || Nickerson (1–2) || Stiles (2–1) || Riley (3) || 353 || 20–11 || 6–8
|- bgcolor="#ffbbbb"
| 32 || April 11 || @ Virginia Tech ||  || English Field || 1–3 || Keselica (3–2) || Stinnett (3–5) || Markey (1) || 1,583 || 20–12 || 6–9
|- bgcolor="#bbffbb"
| 33 || April 12 || @ Virginia Tech ||  || English Field || 4–2 || Shawaryn (6–2) || McGarity (0–1) || Mooney (6) || 1,542 || 21–12 || 7–9
|- bgcolor="#ffbbbb"
| 34 || April 13 || @ Virginia Tech ||  || English Field || 4–6 || Woodcock (1–1) || Ruse (4–1) || McIntyre (1) || 1,136 || 21–13 || 7–10
|- bgcolor="#bbffbb"
| 35 || April 16 ||  ||  || Shipley Field || 11–4 || Morris (1–0) || Condry (0–1) ||  || 347 || 22–13 || 7–10
|- bgcolor="#bbffbb"
| 36 || April 18 || #25  ||  || Shipley Field || 7–2 || Stinnett (4–5) || Heddinger (2–2) ||  || 569 || 23–13 || 8–10
|- bgcolor="#bbffbb"
| 37 || April 19 || #25 Georgia Tech ||  || Shipley Field || 4–1 || Shawaryn (7–2) || Stanton (3–2) || Mooney (7) || 641 || 24–13 || 9–10
|- bgcolor="#ffbbbb"
| 38 || April 20 || #25 Georgia Tech ||  || Shipley Field || 6–13 || Isaacs (5–4) || Ruse (4–2) ||  || 411 || 24–14 || 9–11
|- bgcolor="#ffbbbb"
| 39 || April 22 || @  ||  || Hawley Field || 2–14 || Vance (2–0) || Stiles (2–2) ||  || 608 || 24–15 || 9–11
|- bgcolor="#bbffbb"
| 40 || April 23 || George Mason ||  || Shipley Field || 13–4 || Morris (2–0) || Porcella (1–1) ||  || 201 || 25–15 || 9–11
|- bgcolor="#ffbbbb"
| 41 || April 25 || @  ||  || Pellagrini Diamond || 1–5 || Gorman (3–6) || Stinnett (4–6) || King (2) || 453 || 25–16 || 9–12
|- bgcolor="#ffbbbb"
| 42 || April 25 || @ Boston College ||  || Pellagrini Diamond || 4–7 || Chin (4–2) || Shawaryn (7–3) || Nicklas (3) || 414 || 25–17 || 9–13
|- bgcolor="#ffbbbb"
| 43 || April 27 || @ Boston College ||  || Pellagrini Diamond || 2–5 || Burke (1–5) || Drossner (4–1) ||  || 707 || 25–18 || 9–14
|- bgcolor="#ffbbbb"
| 44 || April 29 ||  ||  || Shipley Field || 3–6 || Howerton (2–2) || Morris (2–1) || Cundiff (3) || 156 || 25–19 || 9–14
|-

|- bgcolor="#bbffbb"
| 45 || May 2 ||  ||  || Shipley Field || 2–0 || Stinnett (5–6) || Connaughton (1–5) ||  || 406 || 26–19 || 10–14 
|- bgcolor="#bbffbb"
| 46 || May 3 || Notre Dame ||  || Shipley Field || 6–2 || Shawaryn (8–2) || Hearne (4–5) || Brewster (2) || 497 || 27–19 || 11–14 
|- bgcolor="#bbffbb"
| 47 || May 4 || Notre Dame ||  || Shipley Field || 3–2 || Ruse (5–2) || Hissa (1–4) || Mooney (8) || 439 || 28–19 || 12–14
|- bgcolor="#bbffbb"
| 48 || May 6 || @ VCU ||  || The Diamond || 12–1 || Ruse (5–2) || Greene (2–1) ||  || 406 || 29–19 || 12–14
|- bgcolor="#bbffbb"
| 49 || May 7 || @  ||  || Ripken Stadium || 4–3 || Stiles (3–2) || Golczewski (1–1) || Mooney (9) || 435 || 30–19 || 12–14
|- bgcolor="#bbffbb"
| 50 || May 9 || @  ||  || Charles L. Cost Field || 21–1 || Stinnett (6–6) || Aldenhoven (2–3) ||  || 220 || 31–19 || 13–14
|- bgcolor="#bbffbb"
| 51 || May 10 || @ Pittsburgh ||  || Charles L. Cost Field || 5–1 || Shawaryn (9–3) || Harvey (2–2) ||  || 197 || 32–19 || 14–14
|- bgcolor="#bbffbb"
| 52 || May 11 || @ Pittsburgh ||  || Charles L. Cost Field || 6–4 || Mooney (1–1) || Zeuch (2–5) ||  || 413 || 33–19 || 15–14
|- bgcolor="#bbffbb"
| 53 || May 13 ||  ||  || Shipley Field || 4–2 || Ruse (7–2) || Walter (1–5) || Stinnett (1) || 363 || 34–19 || 15–14
|-

|- 
! style="background:#CE1126;color:white;"| Post-Season
|-

|- bgcolor="#bbffbb"
| 54 || May 22 || #3 Virginia ||  || NewBridge Bank Park || 7–6 || Stinnett (7–6) || Rosenberger (1–1) || Mooney (10) || 3,408 || 35–19 || 1–0
|- bgcolor="#bbffbb"
| 55 || May 23 || #4 Florida State ||  || NewBridge Bank Park || 5–3 || Shawaryn (10–3) || Compton (7–2) || Mooney (11) || 3,531 || 36–19 || 2–0
|- bgcolor="#ffbbbb"
| 56 || May 24 ||  ||  || NewBridge Bank Park || 7–13 || Hovis (8–1) || Galligan (0–1) ||  || 3,972 || 36–20 || 2–1
|- bgcolor="#ffbbbb"
| 57 || May 25 ||  ||  || NewBridge Bank Park || 4–9 || Roberts (1–2) || Mooney (1–2) ||  || 4,186 || 36–21 || 2–2
|-

|- bgcolor="#bbffbb"
| 58 || May 30 || Old Dominion ||  || Carolina Stadium || 4–3 || Stiles (4–2) || Gero (3–4) ||  || 5,178 || 37–21 || 1–0
|- bgcolor="#bbffbb"
| 59 || May 31 || @ South Carolina ||  || Carolina Stadium || 4–3 || Shawaryn (11–3) || Wynkoop (7–6) || Mooney (12) || 6,813 || 38–21 || 2–0
|- bgcolor="#bbffbb"
| 60 || June 1 || @ South Carolina ||  || Carolina Stadium || 10–1 || Stiles (5–2) || Seddon (3–2) || Ruse (1) || 6,340 || 39–21 || 3–0
|-

|- bgcolor="#bbffbb"
| 61 || June 7 || @ Virginia ||  || Davenport Field || 5–4 || Stinnett (8–6) || Kirby (9–2) || Mooney (13) || 5,001 || 40–21 || 4–0
|- bgcolor="#ffbbbb"
| 62 || June 8 || @ Virginia ||  || Davenport Field || 3–7 || Waddell (9–3) || Shawaryn (11–4) || Lewicki (1) || 5,001 || 40–22 || 4–1
|- bgcolor="#ffbbbb"
| 63 || June 9 || @ Virginia ||  || Davenport Field || 2–11 || Sborz (5–4) || Ruse (7–3) ||  || 5,001 || 40–23 || 4–2
|-

|-
| style="font-size:88%" | 2014 Maryland Terrapins baseball schedule

Rankings

MLB Draft
The following members of the 2014 Maryland Terrapins baseball team were eventually selected in the MLB Draft.

References

Maryland Terrapins
Maryland Terrapins baseball
Maryland Terrapins baseball seasons
Maryland